Ronald Cedric Osbourne Goodchild (1910 – 28 December 1998) was the seventh Anglican Bishop suffragan of Kensington between 1964 and 1980, and the first area bishop from the 1979 institution of the London area scheme.

He was born in Parramatta, Australia in 1910, educated at St. John's School, Leatherhead and Trinity College, Cambridge and ordained priest in 1934.

After a curacy at Ealing he was Chaplain at Oakham School before wartime service as a chaplain with the RAFVR. When peace returned he rose steadily in the Church hierarchy being successively Warden of St Michael House, Hamburg, Secretary of the Student Christian Movement, Vicar of Horsham and finally Archdeacon of Northampton (1959–64) before elevation to the Episcopate in 1964.

In retirement he served as an Assistant Bishop at Exeter and died on 28 December 1998.

References
 

1910 births
1998 deaths
People from Parramatta
People educated at St John's School, Leatherhead
Alumni of Trinity College, Cambridge
Royal Air Force Volunteer Reserve personnel of World War II
Archdeacons of Northampton
Bishops of Kensington
Royal Air Force chaplains
World War II chaplains
Alumni of Bishops' College, Cheshunt
20th-century Church of England bishops